The 2013–14 season was Villarreal Club de Fútbol's 91st season in existence and the club's first season back in the top flight of Spanish football since 2012. In addition to the domestic league, Villarreal participated in this season's edition of the Copa del Rey. The season covered the period from 1 July 2013 to 30 June 2014.

Squad
As June, 2014..

Squad and statistics

|}

Transfers

Competitions

Overall record

La Liga

League table

Results summary

Results by round

Matches

Copa del Rey

Round of 32

Round of 16

References

Villarreal CF seasons
Villarreal CF